James Gordon Brettell (born 19 December 1962) is an English former first-class cricketer.

Brettell was born at Woking in December 1962. He was educated at Cheltenham College, before going up to Lincoln College, Oxford. While studying at Oxford, Brettell played first-class cricket for Oxford University. He made his debut against Lancashire in 1984, before making four further appearances in 1985. Playing as a slow left-arm orthodox bowler, he took 5 wickets in his five matches, with best figures of 2 for 87. His brother, David, also played first-class cricket.

References

External links

1962 births
Living people
People from Woking
People educated at Cheltenham College
Alumni of Lincoln College, Oxford
English cricketers
Oxford University cricketers